The biliteral Egyptian hieroglyphs are hieroglyphs which represent a specific sequence of two consonants. The listed hieroglyphs focus on the consonant combinations rather than the meanings behind the hieroglyphs.

See also
Transliteration of ancient Egyptian
Egyptian uniliteral signs
Egyptian triliteral signs
List of hieroglyphs

References
James P. Allen, Middle Egyptian: An Introduction to the Language and Culture of Hieroglyphs, Cambridge University Press, 15 Apr 2010  25ff.

External links
 omniglot.com